Dick Leslie Dearden (June 3, 1938 – November 2, 2019) was an American politician who was the Iowa State Senator from the 34th District. A Democrat, he served in the Iowa Senate from 1995 to 2017 representing the Northeast part of Des Moines and Pleasant Hill, Iowa.

Education
Dearden graduated from Des Moines East High School.

Career
Dearden served on several committees in the Iowa Senate - the Appropriations committee; the Labor and Business Relations committee; the Rules and Administration committee; the State Government committee; the Ethics committee, where he is vice chair; and the Natural Resources committee, where he is chair.  His prior political experience includes serving on the Polk County Central Committee since 1972, serving as Chairman of the Polk County Democrats from 1980 to 1982, and serving as a delegate to the 1996 Democratic National Convention.

Dearden was re-elected in 2008 with 17,704 votes, defeating Republican opponent Scott Strosahl.

Personal life
Dearden was married to his wife Sharon since 1959 and together they had two sons, David and Mark, and one daughter, Pamela.

Dearden was also a veteran of the National Guard. He died on November 2, 2019, in Des Moines, Iowa, at the age of 81.

Organizations
Dearden was a member of the following organizations:
AMVETS
American Federation of State, County, and Municipal Employees retirees 
Izaak Walton League
Pheasants Forever
Ducks Unlimited
National Wild Turkey Federation
Former chairman of the Polk County Democratic Party

References

External links
Senator Dick Dearden official Iowa Legislature site
Senator Dick Dearden official Iowa General Assembly site
State Senator Dick Dearden official constituency site
 

1938 births
2019 deaths
Politicians from Des Moines, Iowa
Iowa National Guard personnel
Democratic Party Iowa state senators
21st-century American politicians